Surrey South is a provincial electoral district for the Legislative Assembly of British Columbia, Canada that was created in the 2015 redistribution from parts of Surrey-Cloverdale and Surrey-Panorama. It was first contested in the 2017 election.

Demographics

History
This electoral district has elected the following Members of Legislative Assembly:

Election results

External links 
Hi-Res Map (pdf)

References

British Columbia provincial electoral districts
Politics of Surrey, British Columbia
Provincial electoral districts in Greater Vancouver and the Fraser Valley